The list of medical universities in Ukraine includes state education institutions of Ukraine of the 3rd and 4th accreditation levels such as universities, academies, conservatories and institutes. The list only specialises in various schools for medical, dental, nursing and others.

The list of medical high schools at the web-page of Ministry
International European University
Bukovinian State Medical University
Kharkiv National Medical University
Kharkiv International Medical University
V N Karazin Kharkiv National University 
Kyiv Medical University of UAFM 
Vinnytsia National Medical University. N. I. Pirogov 
 Petro Mohyla Black Sea National University
 Bogomolets National Medical University
 Cherkasy National University
 Danylo Halytsky Lviv National Medical University
 Dnipropetrovsk State Medical Academy
 Dnipropetrovsk Medical Institute 
 Donetsk National Medical  University
 International Academy of Ecology and Medicine
 International European University
 Ivano-Frankivsk National Medical University
 Odessa International Medical University
 Poltava State Medical and Dental University
 Uzhhorod National University, Faculty of Medicine
 Taras Shevchenko National University
 Ternopil National Medical University
 Sumy State Medical University

List of MCI Approved Medical universities in Ukraine 
 International European University
 Bogomolets National Medical University
 Poltava State Medical University
 Bukovinian State Medical University
 Vinnitsa National Medical University
 International Academy of Ecology and Medicine, Kyiv, Ukraine.
 Zaporozhye State Medical University, Ukraine
 Uzhhorod National Medical University, Ukraine
 Ternopil National Medical University, Ukraine
 Odessa International Medical University
 Odessa National Medical University, Ukraine
 Lugansk State Medical University
 Sumy State University, Ukraine
 Petro Mohyla Black Sea National University
 Kyiv Medical University
 Kharkiv National Medical University, Ukraine
 IVANO FRANKIVSK NATIONAL MEDICAL UNIVERSITY
 DONETSK NATIONAL MEDICAL UNIVERSITY
 DNIPROPETROVSK STATE MEDICAL University 
 DANYLO HALYTSKY LVIV STATE MEDICAL UNIVERSITY

See also
 List of culture universities in Ukraine
 List of universities in Ukraine
 Open access in Ukraine to scholarly communication

References

Ukraine education-related lists
Ukraine
Ukraine